Pensions in the United States consist of the Social Security system, public employees retirement systems, as well as various private pension plans offered by employers, insurance companies, and unions.

History

While various iterations of what could be considered pensions existed before the declared independence of the United States, most were designed solely for veterans of wars or set up as charitable initiatives by Church communities. This trend continued throughout early American history, with much of the first veterans' pension under the newly formed United States offered to retired naval officers in 1799.

United States Congress later created the Bureau of Pensions to oversee an increasing number of veterans' pensions in 1832 following the granting of pensions to all American Revolutionary War veterans. Eventually, responsibility for these pensions would be transferred to the Department of the Interior in 1849 as returning veterans from the Mexican–American War put further stress on the system.

At the outset of the Civil War the General Law pension system was established by congress for both volunteer and conscripted soldiers fighting in the Union Army. Payouts derived from this plan were based on degree of injury and subject to review by government boards. By 1890, general old-age pensions were incorporated for Union veterans.

Outside of veterans' pensions, the institution of the first public pension plan for New York City Police is considered as the first iteration of a modern pension in the USA. The Police Life and Health Insurance Fund, created in 1857, provided payment to officers injured or otherwise disabled in the line of duty and offered compensation in a lump sum to families of officers killed in action. The fund was initially funded not by state or municipal budgets, but by the sales of unclaimed stolen property, rewards, voluntary contributions and fines collected for violations of Sunday laws, proving sufficient for the relatively low enrollment and demands of the initial plan.

The compensation scheme later came to cover firefighters as well, growing into a lifetime pension plan about 20 years after its initial creation, with added funding from more substantial sources.

Within the private sector, the American Express and Baltimore and Ohio Railroad defined benefit pension plans are considered the first instances of major employers instituting a fully fledged retirement plan The plans came to be established in 1875 and 1880 respectively.

The United States saw significant growth in pension plans, both public and private, throughout the Progressive Era as labor sought more rights from larger, and often more industrialized employers. Private employer retirement plans also grew substantially following the passage of the Revenue Act of 1913, which implicitly granted tax exempt status to retirement plans, making them more economically desirable.

Subsequent revenue acts in 1921 and 1926 added further, explicit benefits to contributions made to employees retirement plans (both defined contribution and benefit) spurring further growth.

The establishment of the Social Security system and numerous New Deal initiatives aimed at providing a safe net for elderly Americans caused an explosion in the size of the nation's federal retirement investment.
 See: Social Security Administration

From the New Deal through the 1960s, numerous federal acts and regulations were created in order to encourage and protect the growing number of pensioners in the US. In particular, early retirement options were added to Social Security benefits and IRS regulations were created that clearly defined tax policies and benefits to pensioners. By the late 1960s, almost half of all employed persons in the United States had some form of pension.

However, the next seminal event in the history of pensions would be the creation of the Employees Retirement Income Security Act, ostensibly enacted in response to the failure of Studebaker and the loss of pension benefits promised to thousands of employees. Among other things, the act set fiduciary duties over pension plans, set funding requirements, and created the Pension Benefit Guaranty Corporation as a backstop to defined benefit plans.
 ERISA
 Pension Benefit Guaranty Corporation

Further shifts in tax regulations, age of participation, vesting status, and contribution limits would be set throughout the Reagan, Clinton, and Bush administrations. Most notably, the Retirement Equity Act of 1984 and The Tax Reform Act of 1986 made significant changes to maternity leave implications for retirement savings' vesting schedules, specific compensation brackets, and attempted to unify rules for individual retirement accounts. Both acts built upon changes made in the Tax Equity and Fiscal Responsibility Act of 1982.

Despite reform legislation under discussion in the ensuing decades, pension participation particularly in the private sector continues to decline. From a peak of nearly 50% prior to the ERISA, now less than 10% of private sector employees are granted a defined benefit pension plan

Types

A Defined Benefit Plan is commonly recognized as a "pension" in the United States. The structure of these plans guarantees a payout to a retiree following their date of retirement. This contrasts with a Defined Contribution Plan which creates a trust based on the amount invested by an employee during their working years. IRA, 401k plans, 403b, and 457 plans are prominent examples of the latter  and are not generally considered pensions in common parlance.

Qualified vs. non-qualified plans

Pensions can either be qualified or non-qualified under U.S. law. For defined benefit plans, the benefits of a qualified plan are protections under the Employees Retirement Income Security Act and offer tax incentives for contributions made by employers to fund the plans.

Non-Qualified plans are generally offered to employees at the higher echelons of companies as they do not qualify for income restrictions related to pensions. Typical iterations of these plans include executive bonus structures and life insurance contracts. Plans are also typically deferred compensation rather than defined benefit.

Public, private, and union distinctions

There are also delineations drawn between public pensions, private company pensions, and multi-employer pensions governed under Taft-Hartley Act regulations.

Multi-employer plans

Multi-employer pensions necessitate a collective bargaining agreement between multiple employers and a labor union. The benefit of this structure is the mobility of labor between these employers without amending retirement and health benefits. A primary example of the benefit of these plans are the nations' Teamsters Unions whose employment demands necessitate movement across many geographies, maintaining benefits in each region.

Multi-employer plans have courted a large degree of criticism in recent decades for corruption related to mob involvement and general misappropriation of pension funds. 

In response to growing concerns over funded ratios, the U.S. Congress enacting the Multi-employer Pension Protection Act of 1980 to increase funding requirements and curb bankruptcy fears. Nonetheless, Congress was compelled to establish further regulations and restrictions on the specific stripe of plan in 2014 with the Multiemployer Pension Reform Act of 2014 (MPRA). Given the billions of dollars in unfunded pension liabilities, the bill proposed reductions of pension benefits to plans slated to become insolvent. The act also enforced penalty premiums on plans that necessitate PBGC intervention.

Tax law
Various federal tax provisions of the Internal Revenue Code apply to pension plans. Similar rules apply to profit-sharing plans and stock bonus plans, which are commonly used for retirement savings. Significant portions of these tax law provisions parallel portions of ERISA (see discussion in a preceding section of this article).

Bankruptcy law

In April 2012, the Northern Mariana Islands Retirement Fund filed for Chapter 11 bankruptcy protection. The retirement fund is a defined benefit type pension plan and was only partially funded by the government, with only $268.4 million in assets and $911 million in liabilities. The plan experienced low investment returns and a benefit structure that had been increased without raises in funding.

According to "Pensions and Investments", this is "apparently the first" US public pension plan to declare bankruptcy.

See also
 Pension
 Pension provision in the United Kingdom
 Retirement plans in the United States

References

Financial regulation in the United States
 
United States